The 18-pounder long gun was an intermediary calibre piece of naval artillery mounted on warships of the Age of Sail. They were used as main guns on the most typical frigates of the early 19th century, on the second deck of third-rate ships of the line, and even on the third deck of late first-rate ships of the line.

Usage 
As the 18-pounder calibre was consistent with both the French and the British calibre systems, it was used in many European navies between the 17th and the 19th century. From the late 18th century, the French Navy used the 18-pounder in three capacities: as the main gun on frigates, as the battery on the upper gundeck of two-deckers, and lastly on the top deck of three-deckers.

French frigates began carrying the 18-pounder under Louis XV, when the two  frigates, originally designed to carry 24-pounders, were equipped with it; at the time, a typical frigate would carry 12-pounders. These frigates were built on standard patterns designed by Jacques-Noël Sané, carrying 26, and later 28 main guns, complemented with smaller pieces on the forecastle. Around 130 of these frigates were built. At the end of the First French Empire, 24-pounder frigates began supplanting the 18-pounder frigates. Frigates built after the Bourbon Restoration used a different artillery system, one involving 30-pounders.

On two-deckers, the 18-pounder was mounted on the upper deck as secondary artillery, to complement the 36-pounder main artillery on the lower deck. A 74-gun would carry thirty 18-pounders; this lighter secondary battery added firepower to the ship without raising the centre of gravity too much.

Three-deckers used 36-pounders on their lower decks and 24-pounders on their second deck. Until 1803, the third deck was equipped with 12-pounder guns, as a heavier gun would have destabilised the ship; after this date, however, Sané introduced design improvements that allowed installation of 18-pounders on the third deck of Impérial; later 120-gun ships of the line used the same arrangement; these ships carried thirty-four 18-pounders. During the First French Empire, 18-pounders would also arm Type 1 Model Towers for coastal defence.

After introduction of rifled artillery in the middle 19th century, long 18-pounders were converted into so-called "14 cm n° 1 rifled muzzle-loaders Model 1864", by etching grooves on the inside of the barrel.

The Royal Navy used the 18-pounder on frigates, which carried 28 guns. Fourth-rate ships carried 26 on their secondary batteries, and third rates carried 28. Unlike the French, the British used second rates, of 90 to 98 guns; the 90-gun vessels carried thirty 18-pounders on their middle deck, while the 98-gun vessels carried a total of sixty 18-pounders, distributed over both the second and the third deck. First rates carried thirty-four 18-pounders on their third deck and 24-pounders on the middle deck.

In his discussion of the single-ship action in which the French frigate  captured the East Indiaman  on 11 June 1805, the naval historian William James compared the 18-pounder medium guns on Warren Hastings with the 18-pounder long guns that the British Royal Navy used.

Citations and references

Citations

References

External links

  Jean Boudriot et Hubert Berti, L'Artillerie de mer : marine française 1650-1850, Paris, éditions Ancre, 1992 (notice BNF no FRBNF355550752).
  Jean Peter, L'artillerie et les fonderies de la marine sous Louis XIV, Paris, Economica, 1995, 213 p..

Naval guns of France
138 mm artillery